A constitutional referendum regarding the Prince’s powers was held in Liechtenstein on 14 March 2003. The referendum had two questions: a "Princely Initiative" and a "Constitution Peace Initiative". The first question passed with 64.32% in favour and the second question was rejected by 83.44% of voters.

The Princely Initiative asked voters whether to approve an extension of the power of the Prince to dismiss the government, nominate judges and veto legislation. The Constitution Peace Initiative asked voters whether to approve or disapprove of constitutional modifications, including modifications which would have restricted the Prince’s powers. The BBC stated that the referendum in effect made Liechtenstein into an "absolute monarchy". In December 2012 the Venice commission of the Council of Europe published  a comprehensive report analysing the amendments, opining that they were not compatible with the European standard of democracy. Prince Hans-Adam II had threatened to leave the country and live in exile in Vienna, Austria if the voters had chosen to restrict his powers.

Results

Princely Initiative

Constitution Peace Initiative

References

External links

Liechtenstein
2003 in Liechtenstein
Referendums in Liechtenstein
Liechtenstein monarchy
March 2003 events in Europe